Edward Cahn may refer to:
Edward L. Cahn (1899–1963), American film director
Edward N. Cahn (born 1933), attorney and former United States federal judge